The 2019 season was RoPS's 7th Veikkausliiga season since their promotion back to the top flight in 2012. RoPS finished the season in 10th position, reached the Quarterfinals of the Finnish Cup where they were knocked out by KPV and the first qualifying round of the UEFA Europa League where they were beaten by Aberdeen.

Squad

Transfers

In

Loans in

Released

Competitions

Veikkausliiga

The 2019 Veikkausliiga season begins on 3 April 2019 and ends on 3 November 2019.

Regular season

Results summary

Results by matchday

Results

Finnish Cup

Sixth round

Knockout stage

UEFA Europa League

Qualifying rounds

Squad statistics

Appearances and goals

|-
|colspan="14"|Youth team players:

|-
|colspan="14"|Players away from the club on loan:
|-
|colspan="14"|Players who left RoPS during the season:

|}

Goal scorers

Disciplinary record

Notes

References

2019
RoPS